Fontana (Catalan pronunciation: [fun'tanə]) is a Barcelona Metro station, located under Carrer Gran de Gràcia and Carrer d'Astúries in the Gràcia district of Barcelona. It is served by L3.

The station opened in 1924 as part of the first metro line of the city, which ran between Catalunya and Lesseps stations. It retains some of its original decoration.

Fontana is one of the few stations in the city accessible via an above-ground ticket hall. This is the only access to the station, and is located on the Carrer Gran de Gràcia next to its junction with the Carrer d'Astúries.

See also
List of Barcelona Metro stations

References

External links

Fontana station on Trenscat.com
Fontana station on the Transport Català wiki, with old photographs and history of the station.

Barcelona Metro line 3 stations
Railway stations in Spain opened in 1924
Transport in Gràcia